Jung Seung-hwa (Hangul: 정승화; ; born 27 March 1981) is a South Korean épée fencer, individual bronze medallist and team silver medallist at the 2015 World Fencing Championships. With the South Korean team he was also gold medallist at the 2010 Asian Games.

References

South Korean male épée fencers
1981 births
Living people
Asian Games medalists in fencing
Fencers at the 2010 Asian Games
Fencers at the 2016 Summer Olympics
Olympic fencers of South Korea
Asian Games gold medalists for South Korea
Medalists at the 2010 Asian Games